This is the complete list of works by American science fiction and fantasy author Lois McMaster Bujold.

Bibliography

Vorkosigan Saga

Cordelia Naismith
 Shards of Honor (1986)
 Barrayar (1991)
 Cordelia's Honor (1996)—Combined edition of Shards of Honor and Barrayar with an afterword by the author.
 Gentleman Jole and the Red Queen (2016)

Miles Vorkosigan
 The Warrior's Apprentice (1986)
 Brothers in Arms (1989)
 Borders of Infinity (1989) including "Mountains of Mourning", "Labyrinth", and "The Borders of Infinity"
 The Vor Game (1990)
 Vorkosigan's Game (omnibus: The Vor Game, Borders of Infinity) (1992)
 Mirror Dance (1994)
 Cetaganda (1995)
 Memory (1996)
 Young Miles (omnibus: The Warrior's Apprentice, The Mountains of Mourning, and The Vor Game) (1997)
 Komarr (1998)
 A Civil Campaign (1999)
 Miles, Mystery and Mayhem (omnibus: Cetaganda, Ethan of Athos, and Labyrinth) (2001)
 Diplomatic Immunity (2002)
 Miles Errant (omnibus: Borders of Infinity, Brothers in Arms, and Mirror Dance) (2002)
 Miles, Mutants and Microbes (omnibus: Falling Free, Labyrinth and Diplomatic Immunity) (2007)
 Miles in Love (omnibus: Komarr, A Civil Campaign and Winterfair Gifts) (2008)
 Cryoburn (2010)

Other
 Ethan of Athos (1986)
 Falling Free (1988)
  "Dreamweaver's Dilemma" (1995)
 Winterfair Gifts (2004)
 Captain Vorpatril's Alliance (2012)
 The Flowers of Vashnoi (2018)

Internal chronology 
 Dreamweaver's Dilemma (1995)—Set in the Vorkosigan universe long before the rest of the series (included in the collection Dreamweaver's Dilemma) NESFA Press
 Falling Free (1988)—Set approximately 200 years before the birth of Miles Vorkosigan—Nebula Award winner, 1988, Hugo Award nominee, 1989
 Shards of Honor (1986)—Set approximately one year before the birth of Miles Vorkosigan
 Barrayar (1991)—Hugo Award winner, Locus Award winner, 1992, Nebula Award nominee, 1991
 The Warrior's Apprentice (1986)
 The Mountains of Mourning (1989)—Hugo Award winner, Nebula Award winner. First published in Analog magazine; included in Borders of Infinity
 Weatherman
 The Vor Game (1990)—Hugo Award winner, Locus Award nominee, 1991
 Cetaganda (1995) Locus Award nominee, 1997
 Ethan of Athos (1986)—Miles Vorkosigan is referred to, but does not actually appear, in this novel.
 Labyrinth (1989)—First published in Analog magazine; included in Borders of Infinity.
 The Borders of Infinity (1987)—First published in Freelancers; included in Borders of Infinity; available online via Baen's Webscriptions.
 Brothers in Arms (1989)
 Borders of Infinity (1989)—Collection of The Mountains of Mourning, Labyrinth and The Borders of Infinity, tied together with an original frame story interspliced between them, which is set shortly after Brothers in Arms.
 Mirror Dance (1994)—Hugo Award winner, Locus Award winner, 1995
 Memory (1996)—Hugo Award nominee, Nebula Award nominee, Locus Award nominee, 1997
 Komarr (1998)
 A Civil Campaign (2000)—Hugo Award nominee, Nebula Award nominee, Locus Award nominee, 2000
 Winterfair Gifts (2003 in Croatian, as Zimoslavni Darovi; 2004 in English)—First published in English in Irresistible Forces, a science fiction/romance genre crossover anthology edited by Catherine Asaro. Also in the omnibus Miles in Love. The Winterfair Gifts novella is also available as a standalone ebook from Fictionwise.
 Diplomatic Immunity (2002)—Nebula Award nominee, 2003
 Captain Vorpatril's Alliance (2012)—Hugo Award nominee, 2013 
 The Flowers of Vashnoi (2018)
 Cryoburn (2010)—Hugo Award nominee, 2011
 Gentleman Jole and the Red Queen (2016)

Source:

Omnibus volumes
 Cordelia's Honor—contains Shards of Honor and Barrayar
 Young Miles—contains The Warrior's Apprentice, The Mountains of Mourning, and The Vor Game
 Miles, Mystery, and Mayhem—Cetaganda, Ethan of Athos, and Labyrinth
 Miles Errant—The Borders of Infinity, Brothers in Arms, and Mirror Dance
 Miles in Love—Komarr, A Civil Campaign, and Winterfair Gifts
 Miles, Mutants and Microbes—Falling Free, Diplomatic Immunity, and Labyrinth
 Test of Honor—out of print; contains Shards of Honor and The Warrior's Apprentice
 Vorkosigan's Game—out of print; contains The Vor Game, The Mountains of Mourning, Labyrinth, and The Borders of Infinity, with the framing story for the collection Borders of Infinity

Audiobooks
Cassette tape and CD versions of Falling Free, Shards of Honor, Barrayar, The Warrior's Apprentice, The Vor Game, Cetaganda, Ethan of Athos, Borders of Infinity, and Brothers in Arms were produced by The Reader's Chair. This company is no longer in business.

Currently, unabridged audio CD editions are available (retail and library), via iPhone/iPod Touch apps using the Folium enhancedAudio player, MP3, Playaway and cassette versions through Blackstone Audio for Falling Free, Shards of Honor, Barrayar, The Warrior's Apprentice, The Vor Game, Cetaganda, Ethan of Athos, Brothers in Arms, Borders of Infinity, Mirror Dance, Memory, Komarr, A Civil Campaign, Winterfair Gifts, Diplomatic Immunity, Cryoburn, Captain Vorpatril's Alliance, and Gentleman Jole and the Red Queen.

Most titles produced by Blackstone Audio are also available for download on Audible.com and from the websites of several public libraries via overdrive.com and Hoopla. The enhancedAudio app versions are available via the Apple iTunes Store and can be previewed at the BlackstoneAudioApps.com website.

Comic books
The Vorkosigan Saga has also been adapted for a comic book in France:
La saga Vorkosigan volume 1 : L'apprentissage du guerrier (The Warrior's Apprentice; literally, "the warrior's apprenticeship"), written by Dominique Latil (scenario) and José Maria Beroy (drawings and colors) (2010).

The World of the Five Gods 

The World of the Five Gods was once informally titled "the Chalion series", but none of the stories after The Curse of Chalion and Paladin of Souls were actually set in Chalion, so the name was abandoned as the series grew.

Chalion
 The Curse of Chalion (2001) Hugo, Locus Fantasy, and World Fantasy Awards nominee, 2002
 Paladin of Souls (2003) (sequel to The Curse of Chalion) Hugo, Nebula and Locus Fantasy Awards winner, 2004

The Weald
 The Hallowed Hunt (2005) Locus Fantasy Award nominee, 2006

Penric and Desdemona (publication order)
"Penric's Demon" (2015) (novella, Hugo Award nominee 2016) 
 "Penric and the Shaman" (2016) (standalone novella, Hugo Award nominee 2017)
 "Penric's Mission" (2016) (novella)
 "Mira's Last Dance" (2017) (novella)
 "Penric's Fox" (2017) (novella; comes between "Penric and the Shaman" and "Penric's Mission" in series-internal chronology)
 "The Prisoner of Limnos" (2017) (novella)
 "The Orphans of Raspay" (2019) (novella)
 "The Physicians of Vilnoc" (2020) (novella)
 "Masquerade in Lodi" (2020) (novella; comes between "Penric's Fox" and "Penric's Mission" in series-internal chronology)
 The Assassins of Thasalon (2021) (novel) 
"Knot of Shadows" (2021) (novella)

Omnibus volumes
 Penric's Progress (2020) —contains "Penric's Demon", "Penric and the Shaman", and "Penric's Fox"
 Penric's Travels (2020) —contains "Penric's Mission", "Mira's Last Dance", and "The Prisoner of Limnos"
 Penric's Labors (2022) —contains "Masquerade in Lodi", "The Orphans of Raspay", and "The Physicians of Vilnoc"

Sharing Knife series
The Sharing Knife is a single fantasy novel published in four volumes:
 Beguilement (2006)
 Legacy (2007)
 Passage (2008)
 Horizon (2009)

These are followed by a short novel or long novella:

Knife Children (2019)

Other titles
 The Spirit Ring (1993) Locus Fantasy Award nominee, 1993
 Sidelines: Talks and Essays (2013)
 Proto Zoa:  Five Early Short Stories (2011 ebook, 2016 audiobook)

Audiobooks
Blackstone Audio produces CD editions, MP3, Playaway, and cassette versions of  The Curse of Chalion, Paladin of Souls, The Hallowed Hunt, The Sharing Knife: Beguilement, Legacy, Passage and Horizon.  All of these titles are also available from Audible.com and emusic.com.

References

Bibliographies by writer
Bibliographies of American writers
Science fiction bibliographies
Fantasy bibliographies